Rockefeller Demonstration Hospital, also known as Rockefeller base hospital and United States Army Auxiliary Hospital No. 1 was a World War One era field hospital designed, located and operated by Rockefeller Institute for Medical Research in Manhattan, New York City.

History
The hospital received its first patient on July 26, 1917. The hospital was set up to promote the newly created  Carrel–Dakin method, which was developed for the Rockefeller Institute for Medical Research by Alexis Carrel and Henry Drysdale Dakin. 

On August 24, 1918 Rockefeller War Demonstration Hospital became United States Army Auxiliary Hospital No. 1, under the commanding general of what was then called the Hoboken Port of Embarkation (later renamed to New York Port of Embarkation).

Between August 24, 1918 and its closure, the hospital trained 998 Medical Corps officers and enlisted men of the Army and Navy in the Carrel–Dakin method and treated 237 patients.

The war demonstration hospital was closed on April 5, 1919

Nancy Poultney Ellicott (1872-1944), Rockefeller Institute for Medical Research's Superintendent of Nurses (1909 - 1938) received a Medal of Honor from the Minister of Hygiene of France in 1926 for her work at the Rockefeller War Demonstration Hospital.

See also 
 U.S. Army General Hospital No. 1 - previously Columbia War Hospital.

References

External links 
  "History of United States Army Auxiliary Hospital No. 1, New York City,” by Maj. George A. Stewart, NI. C., United States Army
 

Upper East Side
1910s in Manhattan
Demolished buildings and structures in Manhattan
Rockefeller University

Defunct hospitals in Manhattan
Hospitals of the United States Army
Closed medical facilities of the United States Army
World War I sites in the United States

Military facilities in Manhattan
Military history of New York City
Installations of the United States Army in New York (state)

1917 establishments in New York City
Hospitals established in 1917
Hospitals disestablished in 1919